Hugh O'Neill or Hugh O'Neil may refer to:

Hugh O'Neill (d. 1524), king of Clandeboye in medieval Ireland
Hugh O'Neill, Earl of Tyrone (c. 1550–1616), Irish chieftain who resisted the annexation of Ireland by Elizabeth I of England
Hugh O'Neill, 1st Baron Rathcavan (1883–1982), Ulster Unionist politician who served as Father of the House of Commons
Hugh Dubh O'Neill (1611–1660), Irish soldier who commanded the defenders in the Siege of Clonmel and Siege of Limerick
Hugh O'Neil (1936–2015), Canadian politician
Hugh O'Neil (baseball), 19th-century baseball player
Hugh O'Neill (artist) (1784–1824), English artist
Hugh O'Neill (soccer) (born 1954), American soccer player
Hugh O'Neill (bishop) (1898–1955), coadjutor bishop of Dunedin, New Zealand, 1943–1946
Hugh O'Neill (Canadian football) (born 1990), Canadian football punter and placekicker
Hugh O'Neill, 3rd Baron Rathcavan (born 1939)
Hugh Boy O'Neill, the last ruler of the Cenél nEógain to be styled as king of Ailech

See also
Hugh O'Neills, Gaelic football team in Leeds, England
O'Neill Building, originally Hugh O'Neill's Dry Goods Store, an 1887 landmarked in the Flatiron District of New York City